Bloodrock was an American hard rock band based in Fort Worth, Texas, that had success in the 1970s. The band emerged from the Fort Worth club and music scene during the early to mid-1970s.

Early career
Bloodrock initially formed in Fort Worth in 1963, under the name the Naturals. This first lineup featured Jim Rutledge on drums and vocals, Nick Taylor on guitar and vocals, Ed Grundy on bass and vocals, and Dean Parks on guitar. They toured the region playing at battle of the bands, opened locally for national acts like The Beach Boys, Paul Revere & The Raiders, and The Five Americans, and released their first single in 1965 "Hey Girl" b/w "I Want You" (Rebel MME 1003). In 1966, they changed their name to Crowd + 1, and released the single: "Mary Ann Regrets” b/w "Whatcha Tryin’ to Do to Me" (BOX 6604), that same year they signed a deal with Capitol Records and released two more singles: "Don’t Hold Back" b/w "Try," and "Circles" b/w “Most Peculiar Things."

Despite a growing regional fanbase, the singles failed to chart and Capitol dropped the group, not long after Parks left Crowd +1 to become the musical director for The Sonny & Cher Show (the beginning of a long career as a session musician). He was replaced by Lee Pickens on guitar. It was also at this time that Stevie Hill joined the group on keyboards and vocals. They continued as Crowd + 1 until 1969 when they changed their name to Bloodrock, a name conceived by Grand Funk Railroad manager/producer Terry Knight, who signed the band to Capitol almost within two weeks of hearing them. They also recorded their first album with Knight as producer, Bloodrock (Capitol ST-435). The album, released in March 1970, peaked at 160 on the Billboard 200 chart.

Shortly after the first album was recorded, Rutledge (at Knight's behest) moved from behind the drum set to take on lead vocal duties exclusively. Austin-area drummer Rick Cobb took over the percussive duties and added his voice to the group as well. This lineup recorded their next four albums: Bloodrock 2 (ST-491), Bloodrock 3 (ST-765), Bloodrock USA (SMAS 645), and Bloodrock Live (SVBB-11038).

Bloodrock opened for Grand Funk on the 1970 tour.

Bloodrock 2 and "D.O.A."

Bloodrock 2 was their most successful album peaking at number 21 on the Billboard Pop Album Chart in 1971, mostly on the strength of their single "D.O.A.", which reached number 36 on the Billboard Hot 100 chart on March 6, 1971. "D.O.A." also gave the band considerable regional exposure throughout the Southwest and West, particularly in Texas and Southern California. "D.O.A." was probably the band's most well-known and well-remembered single. However, some radio stations would not play the song because of its explicit, gruesome description of fatal injury and the use of sirens, the latter out of concerns that the siren sound would confuse motorists. The motivation for writing this song was explained in 2005 by guitarist Lee Pickens. “When I was 17, I wanted to be an airline pilot,” Pickens said. “I had just gotten out of this airplane with a friend of mine, at this little airport, and I watched him take off. He went about 200 feet in the air, rolled and crashed.” The band decided to write a song around the incident and include it on their second album.

Style and personnel change
In May 1972, both Lee Pickens and Jim Rutledge left Bloodrock, with Pickens forming the Lee Pickens Group (LPG) and released the album LPG in early 1973 on Capitol Records. Meanwhile, Rutledge released a solo album in 1976 on Capitol Records titled Hooray for Good Times. Bloodrock replaced Rutledge on vocals and Pickens on guitar with Warren Ham on vocals, flute and saxophone. Stevie Hill on keyboards adjusted to Ham's presence by shifting his own style. These changes to personnel and style moved the hard rock sound of the band in a lighter direction, more toward progressive rock, pop and jazz, alienating some fans. The subsequent album, Passage was the last time Bloodrock visited the charts. It peaked at number 104 on the Billboard 200 in 1972.

1973 brought another personnel change: Rick Cobb left the band, he was replaced by Randy Reader. This line up recorded one album: Whirlwind Tongues (1974).

The end of the road for Bloodrock came in 1975. Nick Taylor quit the group, he was replaced by Warren's brother, Bill Ham, and Randy Reader was replaced by Matt Betton, and an album, Unspoken Words, remained unreleased until 2000, when it was included as part of the CD release Triptych (along with Passage and Whirlwind Tongues).

2005 reunion concert
A reunion concert featuring all five members of the original lineup (Jim Rutledge, Lee Pickens, Ed Grundy, Nick Taylor, and Stevie Hill), plus Chris Taylor (Nick's son) in place of drummer Rick Cobb III from the classic six-member lineup, was held on March 12, 2005, in Fort Worth, for the benefit of their keyboardist Stevie Hill, to help with medical costs related to his combating leukemia. The reunion concert was filmed and released on DVD.

Nick Taylor (born Doyle Taylor in Texas on October 29, 1946) died on March 10, 2010, after a car accident in Cleburne, Texas, at age 63.

Stevie Hill died on September 12, 2013, from leukemia.

Music
Bloodrock's music has been categorized primarily as hard rock. Bloodrock's 1970 self-titled debut album was described in the context of hard rock and early heavy metal by AllMusic's Donald A. Guarisco. Bloodrock 2 was not as gloomy and heavy, and more of a chart success, while Bloodrock 3 and Bloodrock U.S.A. saw the band introduce progressive rock elements. The band's 1972 personnel changes shifted them toward prog rock (like Jethro Tull), jazz and pop music.

Members

Classic lineup
 Jim Rutledge – lead vocals (1969–1972, 2005), drums (1969–1970)
 Lee Pickens – lead guitar, backing vocals (1969–1972, 2005)
 Nick Taylor – rhythm guitar, backing vocals (1969–1974, 2005; died 2010), lead guitar (1972–1974)
 Stevie Hill – keyboards, backing vocals (1969–1974, 2005; died 2013)
 Ed Grundy – bass guitar, backing vocals (1969–1974, 2005)
 Rick Cobb – drums, percussion (1970–1974)

Former members 
 Warren Ham – lead vocals, saxophone, flute (1972–1974)
 Randy Reeder – drums (1974)
 Matt Betton – drums (1974)

Session/touring musicians 
Bill Ham – lead guitar (1974)
Chris Taylor – drums (2005)

Timeline

Discography

Studio albums

Live albums

Compilations

Singles

Other releases
 Unspoken Words (2000) 
 Bloodrock 2013 (2013)

References

External links

 
 
 Bloodrock early history on ClassicWebs.com

Hard rock musical groups from Texas
Capitol Records artists
Musical groups established in 1969
Musical groups disestablished in 1975